The 1943–44 season was Real Madrid Club de Fútbol's 41st season in existence and the club's 12th consecutive season in the top flight of Spanish football.

Summary
A new Executive Board arrived on 11 September 1943, and the club appointed Santiago Bernabéu as its new president. The squad finished seventh in the league, 12 points below champions Valencia. in the first season of Ramon Encinas as head coach. On 16 July 1944, the club played the only match in its history against UD Melilla (until 2018). After 11 years in the club, midfielder Sauto announced his retirement. In the Copa del Generalísimo, the squad was eliminated in the round of 16 by underdogs Granada CF after being shockingly defeated 0–2 in Madrid.

Squad

Transfers

Competitions

La Liga

Position by round

League table

Matches

Copa del Generalísimo

Round of 32

Round of 16

President's Cup of the Castellana Federation

Statistics

Squad statistics

Players statistics

References

Real Madrid CF seasons
Real Madrid CF